Ryan Smith (born in Australia) is an Australian rugby union player who plays for the  in Super Rugby. His playing position is lock. He was named in the Reds squad for round 3 of the Super Rugby AU competition in 2020.

Reference list

External links
Rugby.com.au profile
itsrugby.co.uk profile

1996 births
Australian rugby union players
Living people
Rugby union locks
Brisbane City (rugby union) players
Queensland Reds players